The following NASCAR national series were held in 1995:

1995 NASCAR Winston Cup Series - The top racing series in NASCAR.
1995 NASCAR Busch Series - The second-highest racing series in NASCAR.
1995 NASCAR SuperTruck Series - The third-highest racing series in NASCAR, for which 1995 was the debut season.

 
NASCAR seasons